Kenneth Lawrence Stewart (March 29, 1912 – April 4, 2002) was a Canadian professional ice hockey player who played six games in the National Hockey League for the Chicago Black Hawks. He was born in Port Arthur, Ontario, but grew up in Edmonton, Alberta. He had previously played junior hockey in Edmonton and senior hockey with the Lethbridge Maple Leafs for three seasons, being the highest scoring defenceman for the team in his last season, 1940–41, registering 28 goals and 16 assists. On September 27, 1941, he signed a contract with the Black Hawks of the National Hockey League. In 1946, Stewart was named the playing coach of the Los Angeles Ramblers of the Western International Hockey League. During the season he registered 61 points in 48 games. During the 1967–68 hockey season of the BCHL, Stewart also served as the coach of the Kamloops Rockets.

References

External links

1912 births
2002 deaths
Canadian ice hockey defencemen
Chicago Blackhawks players
Ice hockey people from Edmonton